Bagrat Pakrad (died 1116), also known as Bagrat or Pakrad, was an Armenian adventurer and brother of Kogh Vasil. He befriended Baldwin I in his march to the Euphrates and was given command of the critical fortress Ravendel. Out of jealousy, Fer, the Armenian noble who ruled Turbessel, reported to Baldwin that Bagrat was conspiring against him.  Suspected of collaboration with the Turks, he was arrested and tortured, only to escape to the mountains with his brother. Bagrat became lord of Khoros (Cyrrhus) in 1116 and was defeated by Baldwin.

References
 
 Runciman, Steven, A History of the Crusades, Volume One: The First Crusade and the Foundation of the Kingdom of Jerusalem, Cambridge University Press, London, 1951, pgs. 197, 200-204
 Runciman, Steven, A History of the Crusades, Volume Two:  The Kingdom of Jerusalem and the Frankish East, 1100-1187, Cambridge University Press, London, 1952, pgs. 129-130
 Tyerman, Christopher, God’s War:  A New History of the Crusades, Harvard University Press, Cambridge, MA, 2006, pg. 134

1116 deaths
Armenian nobility